Offbeat (AKA The Devil Inside in the U.S.) is a 1961 black-and-white British crime film directed by Cliff Owen and starring William Sylvester, Mai Zetterling, John Meillon and Anthony Dawson. In the film, an MI5 officer goes undercover to catch a criminal gang.

Plot
After a police sergeant investigating a crime gang is murdered, Scotland Yard are frustrated in tracking down the outfit responsible for large scale bank and jewellery robberies. They bring in Layton, a loner from MI5, to infiltrate the gang.

Layton poses as Steve Ross, a criminal who, unknown to the gang, has died and gone missing at sea. He finds the gang is organised like a business, with salaries, pensions, and a camaraderie he has not known before. He also becomes romantically involved with a gang member, Ruth Lombard. As the plot progresses, she starts to become suspicious of his identity but has feelings for him and doesn’t voice her suspicions.

In a lengthy caper section, the gang drill and tunnel their way into an underground vault filled with jewels. They make their getaway and meet with the potential buyer of the jewels, who strikes a hard bargain. The buyer, who had known the real Steve Ross, spots that Layton is different man. Layton admits his impersonation. Scotland Yard arrive and arrest the whole gang. Layton feels he has betrayed his new friends, with whom he had found comradeship and love but who now reject him.

Cast
 William Sylvester - Layton / Steve Ross
 Mai Zetterling - Ruth Lombard
 John Meillon - Johnny Hemick
 Anthony Dawson - James Dawson
 Neil McCarthy - Leo Farrell
 Harry Baird - Gill Hall
 John Phillips - Supt. Gault
 Victor Brooks - Inspector Adams
 Diana King - Maggie Dawson
 Gerard Heinz - Jake
 Ronald Adam - J. B. Wykenham
 Neil Wilson - Pat Ryan
 Joseph Furst - Paul Varna
 Nan Munro - Sarah Bennett
 Anthony Baird - Constable

Critical reception
TV Guide gave the film 2.5 out of four stars, calling it a "good programmer" ; and Mystery File wrote, "after a slow beginning, I’d have to say that halfway into the film if not earlier, I was hooked to the screen, waiting for the answer. A minor film, to be sure, but recommended, definitely so." The film historians Steve Chibnall and Brian McFarlane describe it as "a work of genuine ideological dissonance which questioned the conventional wisdom about crime and punishment", and they note that Kinematograph Weekly said at the time that Offbeat "carries a kick of one twice its size".

References

External links

1961 films
1961 crime films
Films directed by Cliff Owen
British crime films
1960s English-language films
1960s British films